Gilbert Henry Collins (1890 – 1960) was a British author of adventure and detective fiction. He was born in Southampton to Henry Collins, a merchant, and his wife Harriett. He was educated at King Edward VI School and served as a Gunner in the Royal Garrison Artillery during the First World War. From 1919 through 1922 he served as a member of the British Consular Service in China. He travelled extensively in Japan and China and his first novels were set in the region. His first novel was Flower of Asia: A novel of Nihon, a thriller set in Japan. His next two novels The Valley of Eyes Unseen and The Starkenden Quest are considered classics of the Lost World (genre) and are listed in 333: A Bibliography of the Science-Fantasy Novel a collection of the best efforts in Science-Fantasy up to and including 1950. Abridged versions were subsequently published in the American magazine Famous Fantastic Mysteries in 1952 and 1949 respectively. Far Eastern Jaunts and Extreme Oriental Mixture are memoirs based on his experiences in Asia. In the late 1920s he also wrote for Punch (magazine).

Collins began writing detective novels in 1930. He was also an expert swimmer and an honorary swimming coach at a Bournemouth Swimming Club. He wrote two books on swimming: The New Magic of Swimming and The Newest Swimming.

In 1937 Collins was named in a lawsuit along with his publisher Ward Lock & Co for using a manuscript written by writer Harold Scarborough for the novel Mystery in St. James’s Square. The court subsequently found no one at fault, accepting that Collins and his publisher had acted in good faith believing they had been granted the rights to rewrite and publish Scarborough's original novel. But though the matter had been settled, Collins never wrote another novel.

Works
Flower of Asia: A novel of Nihon, 1922 
The Valley of Eyes Unseen, 1923 
Far Eastern Jaunts, 1924 
The Starkenden Quest, 1925
Extreme Oriental Mixture, 1925 
Horror Comes to Thripplands, 1930 
Post-Mortem, 1930 
The Phantom Tourer, 1931
Chinese Red, 1932
The Channel Million, 1932
The Dead Walk, 1933  
Death Meets the King’s Messenger, 1934
The New Magic of Swimming, 1934 
Poison Pool, 1935
The Haven of Unrest, 1936 
The Newest Swimming, 1937
Mystery in St. James’s Square, 1937

External links
 Gilbert Collins at the Encyclopedia of Science Fiction.
 The Curious Case of the Mayfair Mystery

References

1890 births
1960 deaths
British writers